Taddeo Pepoli, O.S.B. (died 1549) was a Roman Catholic prelate who served as Bishop of Carinola (1535–1549) and Bishop of Cariati e Cerenzia (1533–1535).

Biography
Taddeo Pepoli was ordained a priest in the Order of Saint Benedict.
On 3 March 1533, he was appointed during the papacy of Pope Clement VII as Bishop of Cariati e Cerenzia.
On 15 January 1535, he was appointed during the papacy of Pope Paul III as Bishop of Carinola.
He served as Bishop of Carinola until his death in 1549.

While bishop, he was the principal consecrator of Evangelista Cittadini, Bishop of Alessano (1544); and the principal co-consecrator of François de Mauny, Bishop of Saint-Brieuc (1545).

References

External links and additional sources
 (for Chronology of Bishops) 
 (for Chronology of Bishops) 
 (for Chronology of Bishops) 
 (for Chronology of Bishops) 

16th-century Italian Roman Catholic bishops
Bishops appointed by Pope Clement VII
Bishops appointed by Pope Paul III
1549 deaths
Benedictine bishops